Membrane-spanning 4-domains subfamily A member 7 is a protein that in humans is encoded by the MS4A7 gene.

This gene encodes a member of the membrane-spanning 4A gene family, members of which are characterized by common structural features and similar intron/exon splice boundaries and display unique expression patterns in hematopoietic cells and nonlymphoid tissues. This family member is associated with mature cellular function in the monocytic lineage, and it may be a component of a receptor complex involved in signal transduction. This gene is localized to 11q12, in a cluster of other family members. At least four alternatively spliced transcript variants encoding two distinct isoforms have been observed.

References

Further reading